
Bern Oskar von Baer (20 March 1911 – 27 November 1981) was an officer in the Wehrmacht of Nazi Germany during World War II and a general in the  Bundeswehr of West Germany. He was a recipient of the  Knight's Cross of the Iron Cross with Oak Leaves.

Awards and decorations
 Iron Cross (1939) 2nd Class (21 September 1939) & 1st Class (29 May 1940)
 Knight's Cross of the Iron Cross with Oak Leaves
 Knight's Cross on 13 January 1944 as Oberstleutnant im Generalstab (in the General Staff) and Ia  (operations officer) of the 16. Panzer-Division
 761st Oak Leaves on 28 February 1945 as Oberstleutnant im Generalstab and chief of Stab/Fallschirmjäger-Panzer-Korps "Hermann Göring"
 Great Cross of Merit of the Federal Republic of Germany (20 March 1968)

References

Citations

Bibliography

 
 

1911 births
1981 deaths
Recipients of the Knight's Cross of the Iron Cross with Oak Leaves
German prisoners of war in World War II held by the Soviet Union
Military personnel from Berlin
People from the Province of Brandenburg
Commanders Crosses of the Order of Merit of the Federal Republic of Germany
Major generals of the German Army